Antony I Kassymatas, (? – 21 January 837) Ecumenical Patriarch of Constantinople from January 821 to January 837.

Life
Antony was of undistinguished background, but received a good education, becoming a lawyer in Constantinople in c. 800. He later became a monk and advanced to the position of abbot. By 814, he had become the bishop of Syllaion in Anatolia.  Although Antony was an Iconodule, he became an Iconoclast in 815, when Emperor Leo V the Armenian reinstituted Iconoclasm. The reason for Antony's change of heart is said to have included his hope for attaining the patriarchate. The emperor appointed him a member of the committee headed by the future Patriarch John Grammatikos to find patristic support for Iconoclasm. In 821, the new Emperor Michael II appointed Antony patriarch, disappointing the Stoudites, who were hoping that icons would be restored. When the patriarch of Antioch crowned Thomas the Slav rival emperor, Antony had him excommunicated in 822.  The iconodule historians record that Antony was stricken with a wasting disease as divine punishment for his participation in Iconoclast councils.  The patriarch died early in 837 and was later anathematized in the Orthodox synodika.

References
 The Oxford Dictionary of Byzantium, Oxford University Press, 1991.

837 deaths
9th-century patriarchs of Constantinople
Byzantine Iconoclasm
Year of birth unknown